Hebius yanbianensis, the Yanbian keelback, is a species of snake of the family Colubridae. The snake is found in China.

References 

o
yanbianensis
Reptiles of China
Reptiles described in 2018